Garfield Township is a township in Finney County, Kansas, USA.  As of the 2000 census, its population was 331.

Historically the Garfield Township was organized as Garfield County in 1887. In 1893, the Kansas Supreme Court ruled that the county was illegally organized for not having the required  of area, and the county was annexed to Finney County, forming the current township.

History

Garfield County was created by an act of the Kansas state legislature on March 23, 1887. It consisted of what is now the eastern portion of Finney County north of Gray County, Kansas. The county was named after President James A. Garfield, who had been assassinated six years earlier.

The brief history of the county was marked by a bitter and sometimes violent rivalry between two towns, Ravanna and Eminence, over which would serve as county seat.  During a vote on this issue held in 1887, Bat Masterson and twenty deputies from Dodge City were sent to the county to keep the peace. Ravanna won the election by just 35 votes.  The citizens of Eminence charged that the ballot boxes had been stuffed.  The Kansas Supreme Court agreed, and in 1889 the county seat was transferred to Eminence.

Ravanna countered by hiring surveyors who determined that the county had less than the minimum of  required for the formation of a county under Article 9 of the Kansas State Constitution. In 1892, the Kansas Supreme Court ruled that Garfield County had indeed been illegally organized in the first place. On March 18, 1893, it was annexed to neighboring Finney County.

Both Ravanna and Eminence are now ghost towns.

Geography
According to the USGS, it contains two cemeteries: Eminence and Garfield. Garfield Township is also a home to number of ghost towns.

Sources

Article 9 of the Kansas State Constitution
Garfield County - Kansas State Historical Society
Kansas: A Cyclopedia of State History (1912)

References

 USGS Geographic Names Information System (GNIS)

External links
 US-Counties.com
 City-Data.com
Pictures of the ruins of Ravanna, Kansas, by "Forlorn Beauty" on Flickr

Townships in Finney County, Kansas
Former counties of the United States
Townships in Kansas